Miss Grant Goes to the Door was a short propaganda film made for the British Ministry of Information in 1940. It was directed by Brian Desmond Hurst and starred Mary Clare and Martita Hunt as two sisters, Caroline and Edith Grant, who have to deal with two invading Germans who arrive at their cottage. The film addressed the threat of invasion, and was intended to inspire confidence and convey the message 'Keep your heads'.

Plot
The film opens with sisters Caroline (Mary Clare) and Edith Grant (Martita Hunt) preparing to shelter in their cellar following an air raid warning.  When a man in uniform collapses outside their cottage, they bring him into their home and lay him down on their sofa. When he dies, they realise that the man is a German parachutist and, hearing the church bells tolling to warn of invasion, Caroline takes his revolver from him.

Soon afterwards, a British army officer arrives asking for a map to help him find his unit. In reality, however, this is a German spy, who is exposed when mis-pronouncing 'Jarvis Cross' as 'Yarvis Cross'. Caroline turns the dead parachutist's revolver on him and guards him, while sending Edith to seek assistance from the ARP. When Edith informs the ARP warden of the situation, he calls the Local Defence Volunteers (Home Guard), interrupting a lecture on German parachutists.

The film returns to the Grants' cottage, where the spy engineers his escape from Caroline by asking her for a cigarette. While she finds one, he knocks the gun out of her hands and flees the cottage. His flight is short-lived, however, because the Grants have immobilised their car and locked up their spare bicycle. He is thus apprehended by the LDV, who also destroy a parachute weapons canister. The final scene depicts the Grants thanking a member of the LDV over a cup of tea in their cottage, and he commends their actions with the words: 'You kept your heads. The front line is in every home nowadays'.

Production and background
Miss Grant Goes to the Door was one of a number of films which addressed the threat of invasion, with the intention of being both instructional and reassuring. The film thus includes many details which demonstrated the importance of following the advice that had been issued by the Ministry of Information. Citizens were to follow the example of the Grants and immobilise their vehicles, keep maps locked away and refuse to give geographical information to strangers. The Grants also keep the spy talking, which exposes him as a German. The LDV's concluding words to the Grants, 'You kept your heads', also reflected advice given to citizens in Ministry of Information leaflets.

The film was produced quickly, which was necessary if its content was to be relevant. It was completed on 2 July and released on 5 August 1940. Nevertheless, by the time of its release, there were already errors in it: The LDV had been renamed the 'Home Guard' and the threat of invasion was receding.

Reception
Overall, the film was a success and well-liked for its drama. However, the film was less well received in terms of its instructional element. Reviewers highlighted the fact that the film was flawed in terms of the advice it offered because 'most of us have no revolvers' and in the event of invasion, they could not rely on dead Germans to supply them. Some members of the War Office considered the film 'too frightening'.

Books
Theirs is the Glory. Arnhem, Hurst and Conflict on Film takes film director Brian Desmond Hurst's Battle of Arnhem epic as its centerpiece and chronicles Hurst's ten films on conflict including Miss Grant Goes to the Door. Released in hardback on 15 September 2016 with almost 400 pages and over 350 images "this book also shows why Hurst was an enigma, but a master of the genre, and at his very best when focusing on the vast canvas of film" (from dust jacket). . Publisher Helion and Company and co-authored by David Truesdale and Allan Esler Smith.

References

Bibliography
Anthony Aldgate and Jeffrey Richards, Britain Can Take It: British Cinema in the Second World War
Penny Summerfield and C.M. Peniston-Bird, Contesting Home Defence

External links
Miss Grant Goes to the Door at Film and Sound Online
Official legacy website of the director with filmography including Miss  Grant Goes to the Door

1940 films
British World War II propaganda shorts
Films directed by Brian Desmond Hurst
British black-and-white films
1940 short films